Cataleptodius is a genus of crabs in the family Xanthidae, containing the following species:

 Cataleptodius floridanus (Gibbes, 1850)
 Cataleptodius occidentalis (Stimpson, 1871)
 Cataleptodius olsoni Manning & Chace, 1990
 Cataleptodius parvulus (Fabricius, 1793)
 Cataleptodius snodgrassi (Rathbun, 1902)
 Cataleptodius taboganus (Rathbun, 1912)

References

Xanthoidea